Bruck or Brück is a surname. Notable people with the surname include:

Abraham Jacob Bruck (1820–1893), Russian educator and writer
Charles Bruck (1911–1995), Hungarian-French conductor
David Bruck (born 1949), American attorney
Dietmar Bruck (born 1949), German footballer
Heinrich Brück (1831-1903), German Roman Catholic bishop
Hermann Brück (1905–2000), German astronomer
Karl Brück (1895–1964), German Nazi Party Gauleiter in the Saar
Ludwig Bruck, Australian physician & medical journalist
Richard Hubert Bruck (1914–1991), American mathematician
Yoav Bruck (born 1972), Israeli swimmer

See also
Arnold von Bruck (–1554), Franco-Flemish Renaissance composer
Arthur Moeller van den Bruck (1876–1925), German cultural historian ("Third Reich")